"Favorite State of Mind" is a song recorded by American country music artist Josh Gracin. It was released in February 2006 as the first single from his second album, We Weren't Crazy. The song was written by Marcel and Blair Daly.

Critical reception
The song received a favorable review from Chuck Taylor of Billboard, who wrote that it is "a rousing, party-hardy jukebox directive, targeting fans who enjoy an embossed familiarity with classic giddy-up country."

Music video
The music video was directed by Roman White and premiered in April 2006.

Chart performance
The song debuted at number 56 on the U.S. Billboard Hot Country Songs chart for the week of March 11, 2006.

References

2006 singles
2006 songs
Josh Gracin songs
Lyric Street Records singles
Music videos directed by Roman White
Songs written by Blair Daly
Songs written by Marcel (singer)